Lush Life may refer to:

Film and television
 Lush Life, a 1993 TV movie starring Jeff Goldblum
 Lush Life (TV series), a 1996 American sitcom
 "Lush Life", an episode of the sitcom The King of Queens

Fiction and drama
 Lush Life: A Biography of Billy Strayhorn, a 1997 book by David Hajdu
 Lush Life, a 2005 play by Paul Sirett
 Lush Life (novel), a 2008 contemporary social novel by Richard Price

Music

Songs
 "Lush Life" (jazz song), a jazz standard by Billy Strayhorn
 "Lush Life" (Zara Larsson song), 2015
 "Lush Life", a 2000 song by Sugababes from One Touch

Albums
 Lush Life (Dave Burrell album), 1978
 Lush Life, a 2009 album by B. J. Cole, Roger Beaujolais, and Simon Thorpe
 Lush Life (John Coltrane album), 1961
 Lush Life (Lou Donaldson album), 1967
 Lush Life, a 1978 album by Bill Farrell
 Lush Life (The George Golla Orchestra album), 1986
 Lush Life: The Music of Billy Strayhorn, a 1992 album by Joe Henderson
 Lush Life (Rick Kiefer album), by Rick Kiefer (1975)
 Lush Life, a 1998 album by Peter King
 Lush Life (Tete Montoliu album), 1986
 Lush Life (Linda Ronstadt album), 1984
 Lush Life, Volume 1 and Lush Life, Volume 2 (Tony Scott albums), 1984
 Lush Life (Billy Strayhorn album), 1965
 Lush Life (Nancy Wilson album), 1967

See also
 Lush Life, a jazz club founded by Horst Liepolt
 Lushlife (disambiguation)